The Dutch intervention in Bali in 1908 marked the final phase of Dutch colonial control over the island of Bali in Indonesia. It was the seventh and last military intervention in Bali, following the Dutch intervention in Bali (1906).

The intervention was triggered by a Balinese revolt against a Dutch attempt to impose an opium monopoly in their favour. The raja of Karangasem opposed the monopoly, leading to riots in the capital of Klungkung. Riots also erupted in Gelgel, when the Balinese killed a Javanese opium dealer.

The Dutch sent troops to quell the riots. In Gelgel, they killed 100 Balinese, forcing the Raja to flee to Klungkung. The Dutch then bombarded the city of Klungkung.

In a final confrontation on 18 April 1908, Dewa Agung Jambe, the Raja of Klungung, accompanied by 200 followers, made a desperate sortie out of his Palace, clad in white and armed with a legendary kris supposed to wreak havoc on the enemy according to a prophecy. The Raja was shot by a Dutch bullet. Immediately, the six wives of the king resorted to ceremonial suicides, or puputan, killing themselves with their own kris, soon followed by the other Balinese in the procession.

The Dutch burned the Royal Palace to the ground. As Klungkung came under Dutch power, the Raja of Bangli submitted and in October 1908 negotiated for a Dutch protectorate similar to that of Gianyar and Karangasem. These events ended Balinese resistance to the Dutch.

See also

 History of Bali
 Klungkung Palace

Notes

References
 Insight Guide: Bali 2002 Brian Bell, Apa Publications GmbH&Co .

1908 in the Dutch East Indies
Conflicts in 1908
Dutch conquest of Indonesia
History of Bali
Bali 1908
Wars involving the Netherlands

nl:Expeditie naar Bali 1906 - 1908